The 12504/12503 Agartala–SMVT Bengaluru Humsafar Express is the longest-running Humsafar Express and 5th longest train service of Indian Railways, It is a fully air conditioned express train, connecting Sir M. Visvesvaraya Terminal, Bengaluru, the capital city of Karnataka and Agartala railway station, Agartala, the capital city of Tripura . It is currently being operated with 12503/12504 train numbers on a weekly basis. The train runs through states of Karnataka, Tamil Nadu, Andhra Pradesh, Odisha, West Bengal, Bihar, Assam and Tripura. On its journey the train also touches some parts of Jharkhand in Pakur district but does not have the stoppage there.

Coach composition

The trains is completely 3-tier AC LHB coach designed by Indian Railways with features of LED screen display to show information about stations, train speed etc. and have announcement system as well as, Vending machines for tea, coffee and milk, Fitted with bio toilets in compartments as well as CCTV cameras.

This train consists of sixteen AC III Tier coaches, one Pantry car and two Generator Power Car coaches.

 16 AC III Tier
 1 Pantry car
 2 Generator Power Car

Stoppages 

Also there is demand that Eluru and Nellore railway stations to be provided with halt at these stations.
As of 2022, the train has technical halt at West Bengal's New Cooch Behar railway station railway station, for changing of Locomotive.

Loco links 

Schedule

Service
It averages 65 km/hr as 12503 Humsafar Express starts on Tuesday and covers 3534 km in 64 hrs 35 mins & it averages 66 km/hr as 12504 Humsafar Express starts on Saturday and covers 3534 km in 62 hrs 20mins.

See also 
Bangalore Cantonment–Kamakhya Humsafar Express
Bhubaneswar–Krishnarajapuram Humsafar Express
Nagaon Express
Chennai–New Jalpaiguri Superfast Express
Guwahati–Bengaluru Cantt. Superfast Express
Thiruvananthapuram–Silchar Superfast Express
New Tinsukia–Bengaluru Weekly Express
Dibrugarh–Kanyakumari Vivek Express

Notes

References

External links 

Humsafar Express trains
Rail transport in Tripura
Rail transport in Assam
Rail transport in West Bengal
Rail transport in Odisha
Rail transport in Andhra Pradesh
Rail transport in Tamil Nadu
Rail transport in Karnataka
2018 establishments in India
Trains from Howrah Junction railway station
Transport in Agartala
Transport in Bangalore
Railway services introduced in 2018